An international school is an institution that promotes education in an international environment or framework. Although there is no uniform definition or criteria, international schools are usually characterized by a multinational student body and staff, multilingual instruction, curricula oriented towards global perspectives and subjects, and the promotion of concepts such as world citizenship, pluralism, and intercultural understanding. Many international schools adopt a curriculum from programs and organizations such as International Baccalaureate, Edexcel, Cambridge Assessment International Education, International Primary Curriculum, or Advanced Placement. 

International schools often follow a curriculum different from the host country, catering mainly to foreign students, such as members of expatriate communities, international businesses or organizations, diplomatic missions, or missionary programs. Admission is sometimes open to local students to provide qualifications for employment or higher education in a foreign country, offer high level language instruction, and/or foster cultural and global awareness.

History
The first international school can be traced back to the International School of Geneva founded in 1924 by Arthur Sweetser and Ludwik Rajchman with an emphasis on bilingual education (English and French). Later that year the Yokohama International School was also established in  Yamate, Naka-ku, Yokohama, Japan. These schools catered to children of expatriate families. These could include American diplomats, missionaries, military members, business workers transferred to foreign office locations, etc.

An example would be children of American military personnel attending Department of Defense Dependents Schools (DoDDS).

Criteria
At a conference in Italy in 2009, the International Association of School Librarianship came up with a list of criteria for describing an international school, including:
 Transferability of the student's education across international schools
 A moving population (higher than in state schools or public schools)
 Multinational and multilingual student body
 An international curriculum
 International accreditation (e.g. Council of International Schools, International Baccalaureate, Western Association of Schools and Colleges, etc.)
 A transient and multinational teacher population
 Non-selective student enrollment
 Usually English language of instruction, plus the obligation to take on at least one additional language
However, there are also disagreements amongst educators on what the exact criteria should focus on. Factors such as international history, culture, and perspective within the education curriculum would also make a school "international". Although the nationality of students plays a big part, the manner in which the education is delivered is just as important.

Languages of instruction

While English-language international schools are the most numerous, many international schools teaching primarily in other languages exist.    

For instance, there are 140 "German Schools Abroad" which are accredited and partly funded by the German federal government through the Central Agency for German Schools Abroad (Zentralstelle für das Auslandsschulwesen), and teach a curriculum at least partly based on German schools.  According to the German Foreign Office, the government's support of these schools "helps to  overcome cultural barriers, to convey a modern, diverse image of our country and to strengthen German language skills in other countries."

Other examples of non-English international schools include:

 French schools abroad accredited by the French government's Agency for French Education Abroad (Agence pour l'enseignement français à l'étranger).
 Nihonjin gakkō - Japanese-language schools accredited by the Japanese government's Ministry of Education, Culture, Sports, Science and Technology

Curriculum
Curricula in English-language international schools are most often based on education in the United Kingdom, education in the United States, or curricula specially designed for international schools such as the International General Certificate of Secondary Education or the IB Diploma Programme. These international curricula are committed to internationalism, developing the global citizen, providing an environment for optimal learning, and teaching in an international setting that fosters understanding, independence, interdependence, and cooperation.

Like other schools, international schools teach language arts, mathematics, the sciences, humanities, the arts, physical education, information technology, and design technology. More recent developments specifically for primary school include the IB Primary Years Programme (PYP) and International Primary Curriculum (IPC). Secondary education is provided through the relaunched IB Middle Years Programme (MYP) and redeveloped International Middle Years Curriculum (IMYC). Most recently, the launch of the International Early Years Curriculum (IEYC) in 2016 has provided an international curriculum for early years learners aged 2–5, growing to 500 schools and early years settings between 2016 and 2021. In 2013 there were 3063 schools offering the international baccalaureate curriculum in the world  and over 1000 schools offering the IEYC, IPC, and/or IMYC around the world.

The curriculum could also be based on the school's origin country. Schools that are a part of the International Schools Consortium (iSC) deliver an International Standard Classification of Education (ISCED) curriculum. This is the standard curriculum for American schools. High school education includes core classes such as English, Foreign Languages, Mathematics, Physical Education, Science, Social Studies, Fine Arts, with the addition of ESL (English as a second language) classes for students who may need. In addition, students may select Advanced Placement (AP) programs to prepare for college-level education, specifically in the United States.

International school teachers

An international school teacher or educator is someone engaged in the education of pupils in schools other than their country of citizenship. The term generally refers to teachers who are teaching in private or independent schools. While these schools are private there is an important distinction between private for-profit and private non for-profit schools.

Faculty at international schools are usually from or certified by the standards of their country of origin.

Hiring is frequently done at large international job fairs, such as the ones held by the Council of International Schools (CIS), where schools can interview and hire several teachers at once.  There are also a handful of agencies that specialize in recruiting international teachers. Over the years it has become more difficult to recruit young international teachers, partly because of security concerns and the trend towards less attractive compensation packages. In some countries such as South Korea, recent visa changes have also made it more difficult to obtain both qualified and unqualified teachers.

Education
As of 2020, 33% of international schools are categorized as bilingual, with English as the main language. 52% of international schools offer a UK style of education, around 20% offer the International Baccalaureate Programme, and around 21% offer US style education.

Statically, international school students have achieved higher examination marks compared with the global average:

 The average point score of the IBDP in international schools was 33.6 out of 45. The global average for all IBDP students was 29.63.
 US Advance Placement qualification, international school students scored an average AP exam score of 3.54 compared to a global average of 2.91. The maximum score is 5. 
 In International A-Levels, the percentage of A grades was 34% while the UK average was 25.5%.

There has also been an increase in The National Curriculum of England and Cambridge Curriculum as a curriculum choice over the span of the past 10 years. Schools are also adopting a hybrid model of teaching and learning moving forward to provide more flexibility.

Growth

With the increase in situations such as diplomat relocation or missionary travels, there has been an increase in the demand for International schools. Especially within the start of the 20th century, there has been a massive growth in international schools worldwide. In 2011 alone, 345 new International schools were established. According to the ISC Research Data, there were a total of 7,655 registered International schools worldwide. That number has since risen to 12,373 registered international schools in July 2021. The number of students attending international schools has also increased from 3.54 million to 5.68 million since 2011.

In April 2007 there were 4,179 English-speaking international schools, which was expected to set to rise with globalization. In New Delhi, worldwide entries for the University of Cambridge International General Certificate of Secondary Education (IGCSE) June 2009 examination session are up by almost 20% on the same session last year. The strong growth confirms the status of Cambridge IGCSE as the world's, and India's, most popular international curriculum for 14- to 16-year-olds.

With rapid globalization, these numbers will most likely continue to grow. Asia and the Middle East are the leading geographical locations in international school growth. Enrollment in international schools located in the Middle East alone has grown by 20% since 2015, reaching 1.7 million enrolled students. Southeast Asia has grown by 35.5% and East Asia has grown by 33.3% all since. South Asia experienced the largest jump in growth by 64.6% percent since 2015. Since international schools also tend to offer bilingual education, it is a fitting opportunity for attending students to acquire a second language. International schools have also risen in popularity with the fast-paced growth of globalization.

Criticism
Hannah Smith of The Guardian wrote in 2013 that many students of international schools move between countries and places constantly. Several reported that they feel they have no one place where they have roots or background. Many international students are often referred to as third culture kids (TCKs). A phenomenon they experience is having their identity shaped mainly through people instead of place. An online survey by Denizen shows that over 200 participants first moved before nine years old and, on average, lived in four countries. These reoccurring moves mean children continuously leave friends and relationships, which can bring about stress and anxiety. The transition to a completely new environment and culture can be burdensome as well. However, most international schools understand these circumstances and help students with this transition period through counseling programs.

See also
International schools
List of international schools
Nihonjin gakkō

International school associations and services
Association of Christian Schools International
Cognita
International Schools Services
Nord Anglia Education
United World Colleges

International school teachers
Teaching abroad

Examinations and qualifications
Cambridge International Examinations
International General Certificate of Secondary Education
IB Diploma Programme
IB Middle Years Programme
IB Primary Years Programme

References

External links

 
School types